The 1994–95 NCAA Division I men's basketball rankings was made up of two human polls, the AP Poll and the Coaches Poll, in addition to various other preseason polls.

Legend

AP Poll 
Six different teams held the top spot for at least one week – North Carolina (6), UMass (5), UCLA (3), Arkansas (2), Connecticut (1), and Kansas (1).

Coaches Poll

References 

1994-95 NCAA Division I men's basketball rankings
College men's basketball rankings in the United States